Charlotte Isabel Attenborough (born 29 June 1959) is a British stage, film and television actress known for her appearances in Jane Eyre (1996) and Jeeves and Wooster (1991, 93). She is the daughter of Richard Attenborough and Sheila Sim.

Biography

Family
Attenborough was born in 1959, the daughter of actor, filmmaker, entrepreneur, and politician Richard Attenborough, Baron Attenborough and the film and theatre actress Sheila Sim. She has one brother, director Michael Attenborough. Her sister Jane and her 14-year-old niece Lucy were killed in the Indian Ocean tsunami as it struck their villa on the coast of Thailand on 26 December 2004. Another niece, Alice, was seriously injured. Charlotte Attenborough is the niece of television naturalist Sir David Attenborough, John Attenborough and actor Gerald Sim.

Career
Attenborough had an uncredited role as a small child in the crowd in Whistle Down the Wind (1961) and made a brief cameo appearance in Oh! What a Lovely War (1969) when she was directed by her father Richard Attenborough. Charlotte Attenborough was educated at Lady Eleanor Holles School in London and the University of Bristol before training at the Royal Academy of Dramatic Art (RADA) like her father before her, from where she left with an Acting Diploma in 1983.

Her film roles include Ezekiel (1994) and Mary Rivers in Jane Eyre (1996), while television roles include Poopy Travis in May We Borrow Your Husband? (1986); Teasel in The Play on One (1989); Lucy in Storyboard (1989); Lucy Trent in Making News (1990); Verity in The Ruth Rendell Mysteries (1991); Margaret Froelich in Sherlock Holmes and the Leading Lady (1991); Stiffy Byng in Jeeves and Wooster (1991–1993); Prime Minister's Secretary in Screen One (1995) and Clinic Manager in Ultraviolet (1998). 

In 1987 she appeared as Sheila Birling in a production of An Inspector Calls at Theatr Clwyd, which transferred to London's Westminster Theatre. In 1989 she played Lucie Manette in an adaptation of A Tale of Two Cities for BBC Radio 4.

In 1993 Attenborough married Graham Sinclair, with whom she has two children.

Filmography

Film

Television

References

External links
 

1959 births
Living people
Place of birth missing (living people)
Alumni of the University of Bristol
Alumni of RADA
British actresses
British film actresses
British television actresses
British stage actresses
Charlotte
Daughters of life peers